Felizarda Paulino is a Mozambican politician. In 1977 she was one of the first group of women elected to the People's Assembly.

Biography
Paulino was a FRELIMO candidate in the 1977 parliamentary elections, in which she was one of the first group of 27 women elected to the People's Assembly. In 2020 she was appointed to the Council of State.

References

Date of birth unknown
FRELIMO politicians
Members of the Assembly of the Republic (Mozambique)
Living people
20th-century Mozambican women politicians
20th-century Mozambican politicians
21st-century Mozambican women politicians
21st-century Mozambican politicians
Year of birth missing (living people)